The  Sigsbee  is a Chesapeake Bay skipjack, built in 1901 at Deal Island, Maryland, United States. She is a  two-sail bateau, or "V"-bottomed deadrise type of centerboard sloop. She is one of the 35 surviving traditional Chesapeake Bay skipjacks and a member of the last commercial sailing fleet in the United States. She is owned and operated by the Living Classrooms Foundation in Baltimore, Maryland.

She was listed on the National Register of Historic Places in 1985. She is assigned Maryland dredge number 5.

References

External links
SIGSBEE (skipjack), Talbot County, including photo in 1994, at Maryland Historical Trust

Ships in Talbot County, Maryland
Skipjacks
Ships on the National Register of Historic Places in Maryland
1901 ships
National Register of Historic Places in Talbot County, Maryland